Norma Baylon (born 9 November 1942) is an Argentine former tennis player who was active in the 1960s. She was ranked No. 7 in singles in 1966.

Tennis career
Baylon started playing tennis at age five.

In 1964 Baylon and her teammate Helga Schultze reached the final of the doubles event at the 1964 French Championships which they lost in straight sets to Margaret Smith and Lesley Turner Bowrey.

Baylon's best result at a Grand Slam singles event was reaching the quarterfinal on four occasions. At the 1964 Wimbledon Championships she reached her first quarterfinal after defeating seventh-seeded Jan Lehane in the third round but retired against first-seeded Margaret Smith. At the 1965 French Championships she was seeded ninth and lost in the quarterfinal to Smith in two sets. Later that year at the U.S. National Championships Baylon was seeded eighth and was defeated in the quarterfinal by third-seeded Nancy Richey. At the 1966 U.S. National Championships Baylon was seeded sixth and again reached the quarterfinals in which she won just a single game against second-seeded and eventual champion Maria Bueno.

In June 1965 she won the singles title at the Swiss International Championships after her final against Edda Buding was cancelled at 5-all in the final set due to rain.

Between 1964 and 1966 she played in four ties for the Argentine Fed Cup team winning three matches and losing four.

She won the Olimpia Award, an Argentine sports award, in 1962, becoming the first female to receive the recognition.

Personal life
In 1967 she married Peruvian Bartolomé Puiggros and subsequently lived in Peru for 25 years. The couple had three sons.

Grand Slam finals

Doubles (1 runner-up)

References

External links
 
 
 

Argentine female tennis players
1942 births
Living people
Tennis players from Buenos Aires